NLRC3, short for NOD-like receptor family CARD domain containing 3, is an intracellular protein that plays a role in the immune system.  It was previously known as nucleotide-binding oligomerization domain, leucine rich repeat and CARD domain containing 3 (NOD3) and CLR16.2.  NLRC3 inhibits the activity of T cells. NLRC3 also inhibits the mTOR signalling pathway to block cellular proliferation.

References

LRR proteins
NOD-like receptors